Museo diocesano di Sulmona (Italian for Diocesan Museum of Sulmona)  is a  museum of religious art in Sulmona, Province of L'Aquila (Abruzzo).

History

Collection

Notes

External links

Sulmona
Museums in Abruzzo
Sulmona